Xavier John Ellis (born 28 February 1988) is a media personality and former professional Australian rules football player who played with the Hawthorn Football Club and West Coast Eagles in the Australian Football League. Over 125 senior matches, and two AFL Clubs, Xavier played in three grand finals (2008, 2012 and 2015), winning in 2008

AFL career
Ellis was drafted by the Hawthorn Football Club with their first selection and third overall in the 2005 national draft. In 2006, he focused on completing his year twelve studies and playing football for Melbourne Grammar, where he was co-captain of the 1st XVIII. His season was wrecked by injuries, but he managed to play several games for Hawthorn's VFL affiliate, the Box Hill Hawks.

His debut season saw him rewarded with the club's best first year player.

During the 2008 season, he played 23 matches, averaging 20 disposals. Xavier played in the 2008 AFL Grand Final, where he amassed 28 disposals (the most for Hawthorn) and helped his team defeat Geelong. This would be his first and only Premiership as a player but he would go onto play in two more grand finals.

From 2009 to 2012, he was hampered by a string of injuries throughout this period. He missed most of the 2012 season, only managing to play five matches, including the 2012 grand final loss. This would Xavier's second Grand Final appearance and first loss as a player.

This would be the same time former Hawthorn Football Club Assistant Coach Adam Simpson would become West Coast Eagles Head Coach.

From 2014 to 2015, he played the majority of both seasons including the 2015 AFL Grand Final against his old side, Hawthorn. This would Xavier's third grand final appearance and second loss as a player.

After managing just two matches in the 2016 season, Ellis announced his immediate retirement from the AFL in August via a post on Instagram.

Media 
In February 2017, Ellis was announced as co-host of Weekend Breakfast on Hit 92.9 with Heidi Anderson.

In January 2018, Ellis was announced at co-host of Heidi, Xavier and Ryan, Hit 92.9's Weekday breakfast program with Heidi Anderson and Ryan Jon.

Throughout the 2018 WAFL season Xavier was seen on the Channel Seven television coverage. The following year, Ellis would replace Peter Bell for Channel Seven's coverage of AFL matches in Perth. His role has been primarily as a boundary rider and to conduct interviews during the quarter breaks.

Ellis is currently the co-host of the 'Moreira's Magic' AFL Fantasy podcast with Selby-Lee Steere.

Statistics

|- style=background:#EAEAEA
| 2006 ||  || 32
| 0 || — || — || — || — || — || — || — || — || — || — || — || — || — || — || 0
|-
| 2007 ||  || 32
| 13 || 3 || 2 || 78 || 74 || 152 || 49 || 24 || 0.2 || 0.2 || 6.0 || 5.7 || 11.7 || 3.8 || 1.8 || 0
|- style=background:#EAEAEA
| bgcolor=F0E68C | 2008# ||  || 8
| 23 || 3 || 1 || 205 || 250 || 455 || 151 || 53 || 0.1 || 0.0 || 8.9 || 10.9 || 19.8 || 6.6 || 2.3 || 1
|-
| 2009 ||  || 8
| 11 || 3 || 0 || 87 || 105 || 192 || 47 || 35 || 0.3 || 0.0 || 7.9 || 9.5 || 17.5 || 4.3 || 3.2 || 0
|- style=background:#EAEAEA
| 2010 ||  || 8
| 23 || 10 || 7 || 207 || 193 || 400 || 106 || 89 || 0.4 || 0.3 || 9.0 || 8.4 || 17.4 || 4.6 || 3.9 || 0
|-
| 2011 ||  || 8
| 8 || 3 || 1 || 84 || 64 || 148 || 46 || 19 || 0.4 || 0.1 || 10.5 || 8.0 || 18.5 || 5.8 || 2.4 || 0
|- style=background:#EAEAEA
| 2012 ||  || 8
| 6 || 6 || 0 || 44 || 35 || 79 || 14 || 8 || 1.0 || 0.0 || 7.3 || 5.8 || 13.2 || 2.3 || 1.3 || 0
|-
| 2013 ||  || 8
| 2 || 0 || 2 || 9 || 3 || 12 || 3 || 4 || 0.0 || 1.0 || 4.5 || 1.5 || 6.0 || 1.5 || 2.0 || 0
|- style=background:#EAEAEA
| 2014 ||  || 18
| 17 || 7 || 2 || 174 || 84 || 258 || 53 || 40 || 0.4 || 0.1 || 10.2 || 4.9 || 15.2 || 3.1 || 2.4 || 0
|-
| 2015 ||  || 18
| 15 || 1 || 0 || 164 || 62 || 226 || 76 || 22 || 0.1 || 0.0 || 10.9 || 4.2 || 15.1 || 5.1 || 1.5 || 0
|- style=background:#EAEAEA
| 2016 ||  || 18
| 2 || 1 || 0 || 11 || 11 || 22 || 6 || 4 || 0.5 || 0.0 || 5.5 || 5.5 || 11.0 || 3.0 || 2.0 || 0
|- class="sortbottom"
! colspan=3| Career:
! 120 !! 37 !! 15 !! 1063 !! 881 !! 1944 !! 551 !! 298 !! 0.3 !! 0.1 !! 8.9 !! 7.3 !! 16.2 !! 4.6 !! 2.5 !! 1
|}

Honours and achievements
Team
 AFL premiership player: 2008
 2× Minor premiership: 2012, 2013

Individual
 Under 18 All-Australian team: 2005

References

External links

1988 births
People educated at Melbourne Grammar School
Living people
Australian rules footballers from Victoria (Australia)
Gippsland Power players
Hawthorn Football Club players
Hawthorn Football Club Premiership players
Box Hill Football Club players
West Coast Eagles players
East Perth Football Club players
Swan Districts Football Club players
One-time VFL/AFL Premiership players